Scutus is a genus of large sea snails or limpets with the common name "shield shells". These are marine gastropod molluscs in the family Fissurellidae, the keyhole limpets and slit limpets.

Both the common name and the scientific name reflect the fact that the shells of species in this genus resemble a Roman shield.

Description
The animal itself has a large black mantle which usually completely covers the shell, giving the animal a superficially slug-like appearance.

Species
Species within the genus Scutus include:
 Scutus anatinus (Donovan, 1820)
 Scutus antipodes Montfort, 1810 - 
  † Scutus bellardii Michelotti, 1847
 Scutus breviculus Blainville, 1817
 Scutus emarginatus (Philippi, 1851)
 Scutus forsythi (Iredale, 1937)
 Scutus howensis Iredale, 1940
 † Scutus mirus Gard, 2020 
 Scutus olunguis Iredale, 1940
 † Scutus petrafixus Finlay, 1930 
 † Scutus pliopunctatus Lozano-Francisco & Vera-Peláez, 2002 
 Scutus rueppelli (Philippi, 1851)
 Scutus scapha (J.F. Gmelin, 1791) 
 Scutus sinensis (Blainville, 1825)
 Scutus unguis (Linnaeus, 1758)
 Scutus virgo Habe, 1951
Species brought into synonymy
 Scutus ambiguus (Dillwyn, 1817): synonym of Scutus anatinus (Donovan, 1820)
 Scutus angustatus A. Adams, 1851: synonym of Scutus unguis (Linnaeus, 1758)
 Scutus astrolabeus Hedley, 1917: synonym of Scutus anatinus (Donovan, 1820)
 Scutus australis (Lamarck, 1822): synonym of Scutus anatinus (Donovan, 1820)
 Scutus corrugatus (Reeve, 1842): synonym of Scutus unguis (Linnaeus, 1758)
 Scutus elongatus (Blainville, 1817): synonym of Scutus antipodes Montfort, 1810
 Scutus granulatus (Blainville, 1819): synonym of Scutus unguis (Linnaeus, 1758)
 Scutus parunguis Iredale, 1940: synonym of Scutus unguis (Linnaeus, 1758)
 Scutus savignyi Pallary, 1926: synonym of Scutus rueppeli (Philippi, 1851)
 Scutus veitchi (Cotton, 1953): synonym of Scutus antipodes Montfort, 1810

References 

 Moore, R.C. (ed.) 1960. Treatise on Invertebrate Paleontology. Part I. Mollusca 1. Boulder, Colorado & Lawrence, Kansas : Geological Society of America & University of Kansas Press xxiii + 351 pp. 
 Christiaens J. (1986). The Recent and fossil shells of the genus Scutus Montfort, 1810. Gloria Maris, 25(1):1-28
 Wilson, B. 1993. Australian Marine Shells. Prosobranch Gastropods. Kallaroo, Western Australia : Odyssey Publishing Vol. 1 408 pp. 
 Higo, S., Callomon, P. & Goto, Y. (1999) Catalogue and Bibliography of the Marine Shell-Bearing Mollusca of Japan. Elle Scientific Publications, Yao, Japan, 749 pp.
 Geiger, D.L. & Thacker, C.E. 2005. Molecular phylogeny of Vetigastropoda reveals non-monophyletic Scissurellidae, Trochoidea, and Fissurelloidea. Molluscan Research 25(1): 47-55
 Aktipis, S.W., Boehm, E. & Giribet, G. 2011. Another step towards understanding the slit-limpets (Fissurellidae, Fissurelloidea, Vetigastropoda, Gastropoda): a combined five-gene molecular phylogeny. Zoologica Scripta 40(3): 238-259

External links
 Montfort P. [Denys de. (1808-1810). Conchyliologie systématique et classification méthodique des coquilles. Paris: Schoell. Vol. 1: pp. lxxxvii + 409 ]
 Blainville, H. M. D. de. (1817). Sur la Patelle ellongée de Chemnitz. Bulletin des Sciences, par la Société Philomathique de Paris. 1817: 25–28
 Fischer, P. (1880-1887). Manuel de conchyliologie et de paléontologie conchyliologique, ou histoire naturelle des mollusques vivants et fossiles suivi d'un Appendice sur les Brachiopodes par D. P. Oehlert. Avec 23 planches contenant 600 figures dessinées par S. P. Woodward.. Paris: F. Savy. Published in 11 parts (fascicules), xxiv + 1369 pp., 23 pls

Fissurellidae